Dogwatch is a 1996 American action crime thriller film directed by John Langley and starring Sam Elliott, Esai Morales and Paul Sorvino.

Cast
Sam Elliott as Charlie Falon
Esai Morales as Murrow
Paul Sorvino as Delgoti
Dan Lauria as Halloway
Richard Gilliland as Orlanser
Mimi Graven as Sally
Mike Burstyn as Levinson
Mike Watson as Winch

Reception
TV Guide gave the film a negative review: "...Sam Elliott works hard but can't make this straight-to-video feature anything more than a bargain-basement Bad Lieutenant (1992)."

Rose Thompson of Radio Times awarded the film two stars out of five.

References

External links
 
 

1990s English-language films